Pastores dabo vobis (I shall give you shepherds) is an apostolic exhortation released on March 25, 1992, by Pope John Paul II. It concerns the formation of priests and is addressed to both clergy and the lay faithful of the Catholic Church.

The exhortation emphasizes human formation as the basis of all priestly formation.

See also

 Vita consecrata

External links
 Official english text
 USCCB-Church Documents for Priestly Formation

1992 documents
1992 in Christianity
Apostolic exhortations
Documents of Pope John Paul II